Braunsapis mixta, is a species of bee belonging to the family Apidae subfamily Apinae. Braunsapis mixta is an important pollinator of cashew. they are found in Southeast Asia, particularly in India. Braunsapis mixta nest in stems of pithy plants such as bamboo or cashew trees. These species provide their larvae offspring with pollen during their development.

References

Vanitha, K., & Raviprasad, T. N. (2021). Artificial nests conserve important native bees, Braunsapis spp. pollinating cashew. Current Science.

External links
 Animaldiversity.org
 Itis.gov
 Jstor.org
 Academia.org
i-scholar.in

Xylocopinae
Insects of Sri Lanka
Insects described in 1852